John McGregor (born 5 January 1963 in Airdrie) is a former professional footballer.

Career
McGregor started his career at Queen's Park after signing from Bargeddie Amateurs. He went on to make over a hundred appearances for the Spiders, becoming a mainstay in the side for over three seasons.

He then joined English side Liverpool. He stayed five years on Merseyside making no appearances for the 1st team.

McGregor returned to Glasgow with Rangers. He joined the club on a free transfer in 1987 and made his debut on 8 August 1987 in a 1–1 draw at home to Dundee United. He made twenty-nine appearances in his first season, including in the 1988 League Cup win over Aberdeen. McGregor's career subsequently stalled because of injuries, and he was forced to retire in 1992, joining the Rangers coaching staff soon after. He became the reserve team coach but left in 2003, replaced by John Brown.

External links

Sporting heroes
LFC History Profile

1963 births
Living people
Scottish footballers
Association football defenders
St Mirren F.C. players
Rangers F.C. players
Liverpool F.C. players
Queen's Park F.C. players
Leeds United F.C. players
Rangers F.C. non-playing staff
Scottish Football League players
English Football League players